Charles Keith Bell (April 18, 1853 – April 22, 1913) was an American politician who represented Texas in the United States House of Representatives from 1893-1897. He was the nephew of Reese Bowen Brabson.

Bell was born in Chattanooga, Tennessee. He attended the public schools and Sewanee College before he moved to Texas in 1871. He studied law, was admitted to the bar in 1874, and commenced practice in Hamilton, Texas. He served as the prosecuting attorney of Hamilton County, Texas in 1876 and the district attorney 1880-1882.

Bell was a delegate to the Democratic National Convention in 1884. He served as a member of the Texas Senate 1884-1888 and as judge of the twenty-ninth judicial district of Texas 1888-1890. He was elected as a Democrat to the Fifty-third and Fifty-fourth Congresses (March 4, 1893 – March 3, 1897) but was not a candidate for renomination in 1896. After Congress, he resumed the practice of law in Fort Worth. He was the Attorney General of Texas 1901-1904 and again resumed the practice of law in Fort Worth, where he died in 1913. He was buried in East Oakwood Cemetery.

References

External links 
 
 Biography in the Handbook of Texas Online

1853 births
1913 deaths
Texas Attorneys General
Democratic Party members of the United States House of Representatives from Texas
People from Fort Worth, Texas
People from Hamilton, Texas
Politicians from Chattanooga, Tennessee
19th-century American politicians